The Golden West is a 1932 American Pre-Code Western film directed by David Howard and written by Gordon Rigby. The film stars George O'Brien, Janet Chandler, Marion Burns, Arthur Pierson, Onslow Stevens and Emmett Corrigan. It is based on the novel The Last Trail by Zane Grey. The film was released on October 30, 1932, by Fox Film Corporation. It is based on a novel by Zane Grey.

Plot

Cast       
George O'Brien as David Lynch / Motano
Janet Chandler as Betty Summers / Betty Brown
Marion Burns as Helen Sheppard
Arthur Pierson as Robert Summers
Onslow Stevens as Calvin Brown
Emmett Corrigan as Colonel Horace Summers
Bert Hanlon as Dennis Epstein
Edmund Breese as Sam Lynch
Frank Hagney as Chief Grey Eagle(*uncredited)
Hattie McDaniel as house servant (*uncredited) (this was her first feature role)

References

External links 
 
 

1932 films
Fox Film films
American Western (genre) films
1932 Western (genre) films
Films directed by David Howard
Films based on works by Zane Grey
American black-and-white films
Films scored by Arthur Lange
1930s English-language films
1930s American films